The 526th Fighter Squadron is an inactive United States Air Force unit.  Its last assignment was with the 86th Operations Group, based at Ramstein Air Base, Germany.  It was inactivated on 1 July 1994.

History

World War II

Initially activated as an A-20 Havoc light-bomber squadron in the southeast, trained under Third Air Force.   Was realigned to an A-24 Banshee fighter-bomber squadron and re-designated from the 310th to 526th Fighter-Bomber Squadron in August 1943.

Was deployed to Twelfth Air Force in North Africa in May 1943, being initially stationed in Algeria. Flying operations began 15 May from Médiouna Airfield, near Casablanca, French Morocco. Moved eastward supporting the Fifth Army with close air support missions.  In the North African Campaign, the squadron engaged German positions in Tunisia.

In July, initial elements of the squadron moved to Sicily. From the Gela West airfield, begin flying combat missions, supporting the 1st Division of II Army Corps.  On 27 August, the squadron provided air support for the first Allied landings on the European mainland at Salerno, Italy. On 10 September, three days after the invasion of Salerno, advance echelons of the squadron moved to Sele Airfield, near the beachhead. Enemy shelling of the beaches caused considerable difficulty during the move, and the squadron did not fly its first missions until 15 September.

Moved north through Italy during the Italian Campaign, supported Allied forces by attacking enemy lines of communication, troop concentrations and supply areas. In April 1944 the squadron attacked the German Gustav Line. It also attacked rail and road targets and strafed German troop and supply columns during late spring.

The squadron was an active participant in Operation Strangle, the attempt to cut German supply lines prior to the Allied offensive aimed at rail and road networks, and attacking German troop and supply columns. While Strangle did not significantly cut into German supplies, it did disrupt enemy tactical mobility and was a major factor in the Allies' eventual breakthrough. During this period the squadron received P-40 Warhawks to augment its aging A-36s, but the obsolescent P-40s were only a stopgap measure. The squadron welcomed its first P-47 Thunderbolts a few weeks later, on 23 June.

Moved to Corsica in July 1944. From Poretta Airfield, the squadron flew bombing missions against coastal defenses in direct support of Operation Dragoon, the Allied invasion of southern France 15 August 1944. Allied forces met little resistance as they moved inland twenty miles in the first twenty-four hours. Once the invasion was completed, the squadron moved back to northern Italy and continued its coastal basing by attacking enemy road and rail networks in northern Italy and, for the first time, flying regular escort missions with heavy bombers. The squadron also conducted armed reconnaissance against the enemy in the Po Valley region.

The squadron continued combat in northern Italy until February 1945, when it left the Mediterranean Theater and moved to Tantonville Airfield (Y-1), France, in the Lorraine region, and operations shifted from targets in the Po Valley to those in southern Germany. The squadron's first mission to Germany – a cause of some excitement – was on 25 February 1945, and by March most missions were flown into Germany against rail lines, roads, supply dumps, enemy installations and airfields. The squadron transferred from Tantonville to Braunshardt Airfield (Y-72), near Darmstadt, Germany,

Flew its final combat mission on 8 May 1945.

Just after the war, the squadron performed military occupation duty in Germany, with personnel demobilizing throughout the summer.   The squadron's last personnel were sent back to the United States from AAF Station Schweinfurt, Germany, on 15 February 1946, with the squadron inactivated as an administrative unit in March.

Cold War
The squadron was reactivated in the postwar era 20 August 1946 at Nordholz Airbase, Germany equipped with surplus P-47 Thunderbolts from storage depots in Europe.  Over the next several years, the squadron underwent several redesignations and several station assignments in occupied Germany. In June 1948, the squadron was moved to Neubiberg Air Base, near Munich when tensions with the Soviet Union culminated in the Berlin Blockade.  By 1948, it was obvious that the piston-engine Thunderbolts would be no match for Soviet jet fighters, and in early 1950 the squadron was re-equipped with F-84E Thunderjets for air defense of the Munich area.

With the arrival of the jet age in Europe, USAFE wanted to move its units west of the Rhine River, as its bases in the Munich area were just a few minutes flying time from Soviet MiG-15 bases in Czechoslovakia.  The squadron relocated to a new base, located west of the Rhine River near Kaiserslautern, West Germany in 1952.  Landstuhl Air Base opened for operations on 5 August 1952, and the 526th Fighter Bomber Squadron arrived on 21 Aug

In April 1953, the squadron completed its move to Landstuhl and was soon reequipped with the F-86F Sabre Jet, the first unit in USAFE to fly the most modern American fighter. The F-86F had been very successful as both a fighter and fighter bomber in the Korean War, and marked a quantum increase in the Wing's capabilities.

A year later the squadron was redesignated the 526th Fighter-Interceptor Squadron and assumed a new mission of air defense for the central European region. For this mission, the squadron was re-equipped with the rocket-armed F-86D Sabre interceptor which provided an all-weather capability.

Reassigned to the 86th Air Division and oriented for Air Defense of western Europe in 1960.  Re-equipped with the F-102 Delta Dagger.  On 14 November 1968 the 86th Air Division was inactivated.   The 526th was assigned to the new 26th Tactical Reconnaissance Wing at Ramstein which replaced the 86th AD.  With the phaseout of the F-102 from Europe, the 526 FIS was redesignated the 526th Tactical Fighter Squadron (TFS) and begun converting to the F-4E fighter aircraft.

As part of operation "Creek Action", a command-wide effort to realign functions and streamline operations, HQ USAFE transferred the 26th Tactical Reconnaissance Wing from Ramstein Air Base to Zweibrücken Air Base, and the 526th was assigned to the incoming 86th Tactical Fighter Wing from Zweibrücken to Ramstein on 31 January 1973.

Continued to operate the F-4E until upgraded to F-16 Fighting Falcons 1985.  Supported numerous military units located in the area and participated in numerous exercises that provided the wing with air combat tactics training essential to their mission.

Modern era
In 1994 the decision was made to change the 86th Wing from a composite wing to a wing devoted to intra-theater airlift, and the 86th Wing began to assume the airlift mission previously held by C-130 Hercules aircraft at the 435th Airlift Wing at Rhein Main Air Base, Germany, which was slated for inactivation. With the influx of C-130 personnel, the 526th FS was inactivated on 1 October 1994, with its aircraft and personnel also being moved to Aviano AB, Italy, being assigned to the 510th and 555th Fighter Squadrons.

Lineage
 Constituted as the 310th Bombardment Squadron (Light) on 13 January 1942
 Activated on 10 February 1942
 Redesignated 310th Bombardment Squadron (Dive) on 3 September 1942
 Redesignated 526th Fighter-Bomber Squadron on 23 August 1943
 Redesignated 526th Fighter Squadron on 30 May 1944
 Inactivated on 31 March 1946
 Activated on 20 August 1946
 Redesignated 526th Fighter-Bomber Squadron on 20 January 1950
 Redesignated 526th Fighter-Interceptor Squadron on 9 August 1954
 Redesignated 526th Tactical Fighter Squadron on 1 November 1968
 Redesignated 526th Fighter Squadron on 1 May 1991
 Inactivated on 1 July 1994

Assignments
 86th Bombardment Group (later 86th Fighter-Bomber Group, 86th Fighter) Group), 10 February 1942 – 31 March 1946
 86th Fighter Group (later 86th Composite Group,  86th Fighter  Fighter-Bomber; Fighter-Interceptor) Group]], 20 August 1946
 86th Fighter-Interceptor Wing, 8 March 1958
 86th Air Division, 18 November 1960
 26th Tactical Reconnaissance Wing, 1 November 1968
 86th Tactical Fighter Wing, 31 January 1973
 86th Tactical Fighter Group, 22 September 1975
 86th Tactical Fighter Wing (later 86th Fighter Wing), 14 June 1985
 86th Operations Group, 1 May 1991 – 1 July 1994

Stations

 Will Rogers Field, Oklahoma, 10 February 1942
 Hunter Field, Georgia, 15 June 1942
 Key Field, Mississippi, 7 August 1942 –19 March 1943
 Oran Es Sénia Airport, Algeria, 11 May 1943
 Marnia Airfield, French Morocco, 15 May 1943
 Tafaraoui Airfield, Algeria, 11 June 1943
 Korba Airfield, Tunisia, c. 30 June 1943
 Gela Airfield, Sicily, Italy, 20 July 1943
 Barcelona Landing Ground, Sicily, Italy, 1 September 1943
 Sele Airfield, Italy, c. 15 September 1943
 Serretella Airfield, Italy, c, 5 October 1943
 Pomigliano Airfield, Italy, c. 12 October 1943
 Marcianise Airfield Italy, 30 April 1944
 Rome Ciampino Airport, Italy, c. 11 June 1944

 Poretta Airfield, Corsica, France, 11 July 1944
 Grosseto Airfield, Italy, 16 September 1944
 Pisa Airport, Italy, c. 23 October 1944
 Tatonville Airfield (Y-1), France, c. 21 February 1945
 Braunshardt Airfield (Y-72), Germany, c. 16 April 1945
 AAF Station Schweinfurt, Germany, 25 September 1945 – 15 February 1946
 Bolling Field, District of Columbia, 15 February – 31 March 1946
 AAF Station Nordholz, Germany, 20 August 1946
 AAF Station Lechfeld, Germany c. 1 December 1946
 AAF Station Bad Kissingen, Germany, c. 6 March 1947
 AAF Station Neubiberg (later Neubiberg Air Base), Germany, c. 12 June 1947
 Landstuhl Air Base (later Ramstein-Landstuhl Air Base, Ramstein Air Base), Germany, 1 August 1952 – 1 July 1994

Aircraft

 A-20 Havoc, 1942
 A-24 Banshee, 1942
 A-36 Apache, 1942–1944
 P-40 Warhawk, 1944
 P-47 Thunderbolt, 1944–1946, 1946–1950

 F-84 Thunderjet, 1950–1953
 F-86D Sabre Interceptor, 1953–1960
 F-102 Delta Dagger, 1960–1968
 F-4 Phantom II, 1968–1986
 F-16 Fighting Falcon, 1986–1994

References

Notes
 Explanatory notes

 Citations

Bibliography

 
 
 5
 
 

Fighter squadrons of the United States Air Force
Fighter squadrons of the United States Army Air Forces